, is a 2009–2010 Japanese tokusatsu drama, the eleventh series in the Heisei period run of the Kamen Rider Series and the twentieth overall. It premiered following the finale of Kamen Rider Decade on September 6, 2009, and aired alongside Samurai Sentai Shinkenger in TV Asahi's Super Hero Time programming block. Following Shinkenger's finale, it aired alongside Tensou Sentai Goseiger, until W concluded on August 29, 2010. In the first episode of Kamen Rider Fourze, W is revealed to be in the same continuity as the original Showa timeline, making it the first series to do so since Kamen Rider Agito. The series is notable for being the first installment in what's popularly viewed as Heisei era Kamen Rider's second phase by fans. A sequel manga series, Fuuto PI, began serialization in August 2017 and an anime adaptation began airing in August 2022.

Promotion
Advertisements throughout the months of May, June, and July 2009 built up to the debut of Kamen Rider W, who first appeared at the 10th Anniversary Project MASKED RIDER LIVE & SHOW event, and also featured in Kamen Rider Decade: All Riders vs. Dai-Shocker.

Hiroshi Tanahashi of New Japan Pro-Wrestling is a self-admitted fan of Kamen Rider W, in June 2010 made a new costume designed after Kamen Rider W FangJoker's design and wore it at a match in Osaka on June 19. Rin Asuka also appeared at the match to promote the show.

Production and casting

The Kamen Rider W trademark was registered by Toei on March 27, 2009.

The series' main writer is Riku Sanjo and the main director is Ryuta Tasaki. The theme song titled "W-B-X ~W-Boiled Extreme~" is performed by Aya Kamiki with former JUDY AND MARY guitarist TAKUYA as the unit . The creature designer is Katsuya Terada, previously the character designer for Blood: The Last Vampire, the designer of Monster X for Godzilla: Final Wars, the designer of Cutie Honey's costume for Cutie Honey, and the mechanic and character design refinement for Yatterman.

Newcomer Masaki Suda portrays the mysterious Philip. Drama actor Renn Kiriyama, who made his acting debut as Bunta Marui in Musical Prince of Tennis: Absolute King Rikkai feat. Rokkaku ~ First Service, joins the cast as Shotaro Hidari. Hikaru Yamamoto, who made her acting debut in Watashitachi no Kyōkasho as Chiharu Nobue, portrays the female lead Akiko Narumi. Comedian and actor Takeshi Nadagi portrays Mikio Jinno and veteran actor Minori Terada, known for his leading role in The Human Bullet, portrays Ryubee Sonozaki.

Story

However, this peace is undermined by the Sonozaki Family, who sell mysterious flash drive-like devices called Gaia Memories to criminals and other interested parties. These individuals use the Gaia Memories to become Dopants, committing crimes with the police force powerless to stop them. To make matters worse, the Gaia Memories can cause their users to go insane, to the point where they could die from using the devices unrestrained. After the death of his boss Sokichi Narumi, the self-proclaimed hard-boiled (actually half-boiled) detective Shotaro Hidari works with the mysterious Philip, who possesses a set of purified Gaia Memories, to investigate Dopant-related crimes in Fuuto. With their Gaia Memories and the Double Driver belts, Shotaro and Philip transform and combine into Kamen Rider W to fight the Dopant menace and keep Fuuto safe. While joined in their fight by investigator Ryu Terui, who transforms into Kamen Rider Accel, the mystery of Philip's past, his relation to the Sonozaki Family, and their Museum organization are revealed.

Episodes

All episodes of Kamen Rider W have two titles: the first indicates a story arc while the second indicates the episode's title. The letter of the Latin alphabet in the story arc title has a double meaning: it represents a major character (Kamen Rider, Dopant, or otherwise) that is featured in the arc and another English word that indicates the theme of the arc.

Wind Wave Internet radio
To tie into the show, TV Asahi, Toei, and Avex Trax have produced the Wind Wave FM Internet radio station. Only one of the shows, also exists within the fiction of Kamen Rider W. The other programs, DJ Hurry Kenn's FU-TO Hit on Groove music show and Tsuyoshi and Ayano's  show, treat the television series as fiction, explicitly referring to the songs they play as theme songs (as part of a mail in request, DJ Hurry Kenn played AAA DEN-O form's "Climax Jump", and referred to it as the theme song for Kamen Rider Den-O). All of Ws theme songs have been played as part of the various radio shows, several of which were first heard on the "radio" before being utilized as part of an episode's soundtrack. On March 7, a new radio show featuring Queen & Elizabeth titled  began "airing", but was discontinued a month later. To mirror the current events in the show's story, Healing Princess was cancelled on June 13, 2010.

Films

All Riders vs. Dai-Shocker

Kamen Rider W, voiced by Kiriyama and Suda, made his debut in Kamen Rider Decades first film Kamen Rider Decade: All Riders vs. Dai-Shocker. During the movie, W arrives to fight Shadow Moon, before heading back to Fuuto.

Movie War 2010

As part of the  triple feature, Ws film  opened in Japanese theaters on December 12, 2009. The film expands on the origins of Kamen Rider W, featuring guest star Koji Kikkawa as Shotaro's mentor and Akiko's father Sokichi Narumi. The events of the movie took place between episodes 14 and 15.

A to Z/The Gaia Memories of Fate

In addition to the Movie War 2010 films, W also has a feature film titled . Filmed in 3-D, it was released in theaters on August 7, 2010. Mitsuru Matsuoka, lead singer of Sophia served as the film's primary antagonist. It also features the first on-screen appearance of the 12th Heisei Kamen Rider: Kamen Rider OOO. The events of the movie took place between episodes 44 and 45.

Movie War Core

The second Movie War film to primarily feature W, titled , was released in theatres on December 18, 2010, with the main W section titled .

Let's Go Kamen Riders

Kiriyama and Suda made cameo appearances, reprising their roles as Shotaro Hidari and Philip in the 40th-anniversary film .

Movie War Mega Max

Kiriyama and Suda reprised their roles as Shotaro Hidari and Philip in the 2011 film , released on December 10, 2011. The third out of the 5 parts of this Movie War, took places in Fuuto and featured Kamen Rider W continuing his battle against Foundation X.

Kamen Rider Taisen

 made its theater debut on March 29, 2014. Masahiro Inoue, playing Kamen Rider Decade, alongside many other lead actors of other series appeared in the film, including Gaku Sano of Kamen Rider Gaim, Renn Kiriyama of Kamen Rider W, Kohei Murakami and Kento Handa of Kamen Rider 555, Shunya Shiraishi from Kamen Rider Wizard, Ryo Hayami of Kamen Rider X, and Hiroshi Fujioka of the original Kamen Rider. The Sentai teams' Ressha Sentai ToQger and Ryo Ryusei as Daigo Kiryu from Zyuden Sentai Kyoryuger were also in the movie. Shun Sugata playing Kamen Rider ZX from the Birth of the 10th! Kamen Riders All Together!! TV special returned, also performing as Ambassador Darkness. Itsuji Itao of Kamen Rider The First played Ren Aoi, Kamen Rider Fifteen, a main antagonist of the film.

Video games
 A second port of Kamen Rider: Climax Heroes titled  for the Wii was released on December 3, 2009. It features Kamen Rider W as a playable character and also features Dopants and other kaijin as characters in the game.
 Kamen Rider: Memory of Heroez is a 3D action game, which was released on October 29, 2020 for PlayStation 4 and Nintendo Switch. It features the cast from Kamen Rider W, OOO and Zero-One, whereas Kamen Riders W (including Joker and W FangJoker) and Accel as playable characters, though with Yoshimasa Hosoya, Koki Uchiyama, and Makoto Furukawa voicing them instead of Renn Kiriyama, Masaki Suda, and Minehiro Kinomoto respectively.

Mini-dramas
As part of the special features on the DVD releases, a series of short films are included called  in which Shotaro daydreams about what life would be like if he, Akiko, or Ryu acted differently. These feature a Dopant from the DVD volume in a completely different role than it had in the series proper. These are then followed by members of the cast discussing their favorite parts of the episodes included in the DVD volume. These mini-dramas appear again in Fuuto PI.
Volume titles

Planetarium film
At several planetaria throughout Japan, Toei had produced a film called  to teach children about global warming (with narration by Hirohiko Kakegawa). Shotaro Hidari (portrayed by Kiriyama) and Philip (portrayed by Suda) who transform into Kamen Rider W, alongside Kamen Rider 1 (voiced by Tetsu Inada), Kamen Rider 2 (voiced by Takahiro Fujimoto), and the ten previous Heisei Riders, fight Shocker led by its President (Hidekatsu Shibata) and Gelshocker's Leechameleon (voiced by Yasuhiro Takato) who plan on destroying the Earth by having it succumb to global warming. Airings first began at the Fukuoka Science Museum on June 5, 2010, and later at Kagawa Prefecture's Sanuki Kid's Land, Chūō, Tokyo's Time Dome Akashi, the Seki Manabi Center, the Kagoshima Municipal Science Center, the Tondabayashi Subaru Hall, and the Sendai Astronomical Observatory in Aoba-ku, with shows starting later in the year at the Kobe Science Museum in Chūō-ku, Kobe, and the Saitama Municipal Youth's Astronomical Science Museum in Urawa-ku, Saitama.

Televi-Kun DVDs
The Hyper Battle DVD for W is titled . It features a cooking contest between Ryu Terui, Akiko Narumi, and Shotaro Hidari, in order to best figure out what the contents of the Donburi Dopant are, to eventually discover that he is the Oyakodon Dopant. The Hyper Battle DVD features guest stars Hiroshi as the OmuriFu Shop's Master , Reina Fujie of AKB48 as his daughter , and Shinichiro Ohta of Iron Chef fame as the voice of the Frog Pod who comments throughout the cooking contest (Ōta also served as the narrator in GoGo Sentai Boukenger).

The  is a DVD packaged with the August 2010 issue of Televi-Kun magazine. The issue also comes with a short book with the information described in the DVD. The DVD is set shortly after the Hyper Battle DVD, and features the content normally found in the Hyper Battle DVD (explaining the powers and weapons of the Kamen Riders), explained as Philip having come down with temporary amnesia after slipping on an egg shell and hitting his head.

W Returns

 is a set of two V-Cinema releases that focus on side stories of Ryu Terui as Kamen Rider Accel and Katsumi Daido as Kamen Rider Eternal. Both releases are named after their primary character.

Playback
Ws S.I.C Hero Saga side story Kamen Rider W: Playback commemorates the 40th anniversary of the Kamen Rider Series with Shotaro Hidari and Philip leading Shotaro Ishinomori through the events following his creation of the television series in 1971. The first episode was published in Hobby Japan, July 2011. Each episode is named after a different story written by Raymond Chandler.

The One Who Continues After Z
, written by Riku Sanjo, is part of a series of spin-off novel adaptions of the Heisei Era Kamen Riders. Phillip takes up Shotaro's job in solving cases after he becomes sick. Phillip uses Kamen Rider W Fang Joker and fights alongside Kamen Rider Accel, however the Dopants get tougher and force Philip to become a Kamen Rider himself: Kamen Rider Cyclone. The novel was released on November 30, 2012. The novel takes place between episodes 32 and 33.

Fuuto PI

 is a manga sequel that has been serialized in Big Comic Spirits weekly magazine since August 7, 2017. Riku Sanjo, the main writer for the original series, was in charge of the manga's scripts, Masaki Sato drew the manga, Toei producer Hideaki Tsukada supervised the manga, and Katsuya Terada was credited for creature designs.

An anime adaptation celebrates the 50th anniversary of the Kamen Rider series and began airing in August 2022. The story is set after Kamen Rider W Returns: Kamen Rider Accel. The series will be streamed in English by Funimation. Some of the cast who has previously voiced their characters in the video game Kamen Rider: Memory of Heroez reprises their roles.

Cast
 : 
 : 
 : 
 : 
 : 
 : 
 : 
 : 
 : 
 : 
 : 
 : 
 : 
 : 
 : 
 : 
 : 
 : 
 Narration, Gaia Memory Voice:

Guest cast

 : 
 : 
 : 
 : 
 : 
 Teacher (7, 8): 
 : 
 : KOJI
 Young girl (12): 
 : 
 : 
 : 
 : 
 : 
 
 TAKUYA (23, 24)
 : 
 DJ Hurry Kenn (Voice; 23, 24)
 : 
 : 
 : 
 : 
 : 
 : 
 : 
 : 
 : 
 :

Songs
Opening theme
 "W-B-X (W-Boiled Extreme)"
 Lyrics: Shoko Fujibayashi
 Composition: Shuhei Naruse
 Arrangement: TAKUYA, Shuhei Naruse
 Artist: 
Read as "Double-B-X ~Double Boiled Extreme~", the song is written by Fujibayashi and Naruse, who have contributed to the production of the highest peaking Heisei Kamen Rider Series theme songs "Climax Jump" (#2), "Break the Chain" (#3), and "Journey through the Decade" (#2) on the Oricon charts, performed by Kamiki and TAKUYA and was released on November 11, 2009. In its first week of release, it peaked at #8 on the Oricon Weekly Charts.
Episodes 28 and 49 used the song as the ending theme.

 Insert themes
 "Cyclone Effect"
 Lyrics: Shoko Fujibayashi
 Composition: AYANO (of FULL AHEAD)
 Arrangement: Labor Day
 Artist: Labor Day
 Episodes: 3–6, 9, 21, 23, 24, 25, 45
The first of the Kamen Rider W ending themes "Cyclone Effect" was released on November 25, 2009, on a maxi single. While the song is intended to be the theme for Kamen Rider W CycloneJoker, the song is also played during other forms' fight scenes.
 "Free your Heat"
 Lyrics: Shoko Fujibayashi
 Composition & Arrangement: Ryo (of defspiral)
 Artist: Galveston 19
 Episodes: 10, 11, 13, 19, 20, 21
This theme for Kamen Rider W HeatMetal was first played on the Wind Wave radio show. It later entered circulation as one of the three ending themes, released on CD on December 16, 2009.
 "Finger on the Trigger"
 Lyrics: Shoko Fujibayashi & Otoko Usagi
 Composition & Arrangement: Junichi "IGAO" Igarashi
 Artist: Florida Keys
 Episodes: 7, 8, 14, 16, 18, 23, 30, 39
This theme for Kamen Rider W LunaTrigger was featured briefly on the Wind Wave internet radio shows shortly before premiering in the series. This song was released on CD on December 16, 2009. The band is composed of members of the band , featuring vocals by Yosh and U-Sagi with IGAO on keyboard.
 "Naturally"
 Lyrics: Shoko Fujibayashi
 Composition & Arrangement: Shuhei Naruse
 Artist: Wakana Sonozaki (Rin Asuka)
 Episodes: 13, 14, 17
Wakana Sonozaki (Rin Asuka) also has her own single titled "Naturally" that debuted during her talk show. It was later featured in the television series during a story arc that focused on her (Shotaro and Philip, as fans of her show, know all the lyrics and the accompanying dance). "Naturally" was released on CD on January 27, 2010.
 "Leave all Behind"
 Lyrics: Shoko Fujibayashi
 Composition: Ryo (of defspiral)
 Arrangement: Wilma-Sidr
 Artist: Wilma-Sidr
 Episodes: 22, 44
This new song premiered on the FU-TO HIT on GROOVE show which marked the day of Kamen Rider Accel's appearance in the series. In episode 22, it is first used as Kamen Rider Accel's ending theme. It was released on CD on April 28, 2010. The members of Wilma-Sidr are the current line up of defspiral, previously known as Transtic Nerve and the Underneath.
 "Love♡Wars"
 Lyrics: Shoko Fujibayashi
 Composition & Arrangement: Shuhei Naruse
 Artist: Queen & Elizabeth (Tomomi Itano & Tomomi Kasai)
 Episodes: 23, 24
As part of their involvement in the Kamen Rider W production, Tomomi Itano and Tomomi Kasai of AKB48 released the song "Love♡Wars" on March 31, 2010, as four different CDs, three of which contain DVDs with a music video, trading cards, and a special bonus track. The fourth is a CD-only release without the bonus track(s) available on the other three discs. The song debuted in the show during episodes 23 & 24 in which their characters Queen & Elizabeth are performing in a competition akin to Pop Idol to get a major release. In its first week of release it sold over 21,000 copies, reaching #4 on the Oricon Weekly Rankings.
"Nobody's Perfect"
 Lyrics: Gorō Matsui
 Composition: Sokichi Narumi (Koji Kikkawa)
 Arrangement: Hiroaki Sugawara
 Artist: Sokichi Narumi (Koji Kikkawa)
 Episodes: 32, 38, 41, 42 & Movie War Core
Koji Kikkawa recorded "Nobody's Perfect" as Kamen Rider Skull's theme song. A single (as a CD single and a CD+DVD version) was released on June 30, 2010. Although it is not used as an ending theme, the song is featured in several episodes and was used as the instrumental theme for the final episode preview. The song's music video, directed by Ryuta Tasaki, tells a side story with Philip finding a book entitled "Nobody's Perfect". He views a number of flashbacks involving Sokichi Narumi and his past as Kamen Rider Skull, taking on a case with Shotaro.
 "Extreme Dream"
 Lyrics: Shoko Fujibayashi
 Composition: AYANO (of FULL AHEAD)
 Arrangement: Labor Day
 Artist: Labor Day
 Episodes: 46, 48
On the June 13, 2010 episode of FU-TO HIT on GROOVE, Labor Day debuted their newest song for the series: "Extreme Dream". The song was not featured in the television series until 2 months later.
 "Cyclone Effect (acoustic edit.)"
 Lyrics: Shoko Fujibayashi
 Composition: AYANO (of FULL AHEAD)
 Arrangement: Labor Day
 Artist: Labor Day
 Episodes: 48
This variation of "Cyclone Effect" is first heard in the background of episode 21. The song is later used as the ending theme for episode 48.

During the events of episode 8, the song  by Florida Keys was played within the show by a character. During episodes 23 and 24, the character Jimmy Nakata performed an original song titled ; this song was included as a bonus track on the standard DVD release version of the "Love♡Wars" single. During episode 23, Shotaro and Philip cover "Finger on the Trigger" in the Fuuuuuutic Idol contest. In addition to these songs, Head Wind One-Game Match!! DJs  have written and performed the song "WIND WAVE" as a theme song for the fictional radio station. This song, as well as "Glorious Street (Eikō no Michi)", and "Extreme Dream" have been included in the complete CD box set.

The bands that perform the series' ending themes are also featured in the programs as being local bands in the fictional city of Fuuto: crossover rock band Labor Day's "Cyclone Effect", heavy metal/hard rock band Galveston 19's "Free Your Heat", and hip-hop group Florida Keys' "Finger on the Trigger". Each of these bands is named after a major early 20th century hurricane: the 1935 Labor Day hurricane, the 1900 Galveston hurricane, and the 1919 Florida Keys hurricane. The newest group, the visual kei band Wilma-Sidr, is named after Hurricane Wilma and Cyclone Sidr.

 "FINALLY"
 Artist: Melissa (hikaru yamamoto)
 "Love♡Wars acoustic edit"
 Artist: Queen & Elizabeth
 "Finger on the Trigger (heisei best Re-edit Ver.)
 Artist: Shotaro Hidari & Philip
 "Glorious street 〜栄光の道〜"
 "fuuto tower"
 "WIND WAVE"
 "HEART∞BREAKER"
 Artist: Daikichi (maki oguro & koji kikkawa)
 "W"
 Artist: Mitsuru matsuoka
 "cod-E ～Eの暗号～"
 Artist: Shopia

Parodies
Episode 295-A of Sgt. Frog titled  features the members of the Keroro Platoon finding an artifact that allows two of them to combine into a single Keroro, each with new powers. The episode title is based on Kamen Rider Ws catchphrase and the resultant transformation resembles that of Kamen Rider W (the characters appear to be split down the middle, with one side being, for example, Keroro and the other Tamama).

References

External links
 
 Official website at Toei Company
 Official website  at Avex Group
 

W
Detective fiction
2009 Japanese television series debuts
2010 Japanese television series endings
Japanese supernatural television series
Japanese crime television series
Fiction about murder
Television shows about psychic powers
Sentient objects in fiction